Publius Cornelius Dolabella may refer to:

 Publius Cornelius Dolabella (consul 283 BC)
 Publius Cornelius Dolabella (consul 44 BC)
 Publius Cornelius Dolabella (consul 35 BC)
 Publius Cornelius Dolabella (consul 10)
 Publius Cornelius Dolabella (consul 55)

See also
 Cornelii Dolabellae